Curious Punishments of Bygone Days is a history book published in 1896.  It was written by Alice Morse Earle and printed by Herbert S. Stone & Company. Earle was a historian of Colonial America, and she writes in her introduction:

In ransacking old court records, newspapers, diaries and letters for the historic foundation of the books which I have written on colonial history, I have found and noted much of interest that has not been used or referred to in any of those books. An accumulation of notes on old-time laws, punishments and penalties has evoked this volume.

As the title suggests, the subject of the chapters is various archaic punishments.  Morse seems to make a distinction between stocks for the feet, in the Stocks chapter, and stocks for the head, described in the Pillory article- which itself clashes with the modern day understanding of a pillory as a whipping post.

Table of contents
Foreword
The Bilboes
The Ducking Stool
The Stocks
The Pillory
Punishments of Authors and Books
The Whipping Post
The Scarlet Letter
Branks and Gags
Public Penance
Military Punishments
Branding and Maiming

References

External links

 Text of Curious Punishments of Bygone Days; public domain

Non-fiction crime books
Torture
1896 non-fiction books
Penology